The Black Mamba is a Portuguese band. They represented Portugal in the Eurovision Song Contest 2021 in Rotterdam with the song "Love Is on My Side". The band has released three albums: The Black Mamba (2010), Dirty Little Brother (2014) and The Mamba King (2018).

Discography

Albums

Singles

As lead artist

As featured artist

References

Portuguese musical groups
Eurovision Song Contest entrants for Portugal
Eurovision Song Contest entrants of 2021
Musical groups established in 2010
2010 establishments in Portugal